Tristwood are an Industrial black metal band from Innsbruck, Tyrol in Austria. The band was founded in 1996 by Deimon and Neru who were the first two for forming under the name December. Their early MCD demo, Torment that was recorded in January 1997 managed to get great sales under their original genre of black metal however after recording they disbanded for several years until 2001 when Neru and Jegger decided to reform the band under the name Tristwood. Deimon came back to the band and together in 2003 they began recording the MCD entitled Fragments Of The Mechanical Unbecoming. The MCD contained far more technical advancements using additional programming and synthesizers causing the band's output to be categorised under the Industrial side of music.

In December 2003 the band worked on their first full-length album Amygdala. Straight after the release a follow up album was made, Fragments… which saw the addition of a DVD and was classified as a limited box set. During that same year, an addition of vocals, Axumis was recruited. After the two releases the band then in 2005 re-produced previous MCDs on an EP compilation called Svarta Daudi which was recorded in only 10 hours. The Delphic Doctrine was recorded in September. Some of their recordings were sent to the record company, Sound Riot Records who offered a contract to the band.

The Delphic Doctrine which was released in March 2006 has received more attention than any of their other releases thanks to Sound Riot Records and their pushing for Tristwood to do more and more tours. On 30 May 2006 the band acquired a new bassist, Yak. In 2008 they started to record their new record Dystopia et Disturbia, which will be released in 2010.

Current members
 N - Rhythm Guitars, Synths, Programming
 A - Lead Vocals, Throat Choirs
 Y - Bass Guitars
 D - Keyboards, additional Synths, Sampling
 J - Lead & Rhythm Guitars, Vocals, Throat Choirs
 HMG - Drums

Discography
 Torment (January 1997, MCD - recorded as "December")
 Fragments Of The Mechanical Unbecoming (2003, MCD)
 Amygdala (2004, MCD)
 Svarta Daudi (2005, MCD)
 The Delphic Doctrine (2006, Album)
 By the Call of Seth (2006, Single)
 Dystopia et Disturbia (2010, Album)
 Nyx (2019, Album)
 Blackcrowned Majesty (2020, Album)

External links
 Tristwood at Myspace.com
 Sound Riot Records official website
 Sound Riot Records at Myspace.com

Austrian black metal musical groups
Austrian death metal musical groups
Austrian heavy metal musical groups
Blackened death metal musical groups
Musical groups established in 1996
Industrial metal musical groups